Kay Oyegun is an American writer, producer, and director.  She is known for her writing for This Is Us, of which she also produced and directed several episodes, and her writing for Queen Sugar. She is Nigerian.    She made her This Is Us directorial debut in the "Birth Mother" episode which aired on January 12, 2021.

Oyegun wrote the original script for Assisted Living, an upcoming Paramount movie which will mark Cardi B's debut in a leading movie role.

Oyegun has a bachelor's degree in Journalism from the University of Pittsburgh and an MFA in Producing from USC.

References

American writers
American film directors
American producers
Living people
Year of birth missing (living people)